The 30th Edition Vuelta a España (Tour of Spain), a long-distance bicycle stage race and one of the three grand tours, was held from 22 April to 11 May 1975. Andrés Oliva won the mountains classification while Miguel María Lasa won the points classification.

Teams and riders

Route

Results

Final General Classification

References

 
1975 in road cycling
1975
1975 in Spanish sport
April 1975 sports events in Europe
May 1975 sports events in Europe
1975 Super Prestige Pernod